The rural–urban fringe, also known as the outskirts, rurban, peri-urban  or the urban hinterland, can be described as the "landscape interface between town and country", or also as the transition zone where urban and rural uses mix and often clash together. Alternatively, it can be viewed as a landscape type in its own right, one forged from an interaction of urban and rural land uses.

Definition 

Its definition shifts depending on the global location, but typically in Europe, where urban areas are intensively managed to prevent urban sprawl and protect agricultural land, the urban fringe will be characterized by certain land uses which have either purposely moved away from the urban area, or require much larger tracts of land. As examples:

 Roads, especially motorways and bypasses
 Waste transfer stations, recycling facilities and landfill sites
 Park and ride sites
 Airports
 Large hospitals 
 Power, water and sewerage facilities
 Factories
 Large out-of-town shopping facilities, e.g. large supermarkets
 Compact residential areas

Despite these 'urban' uses, the fringe remains largely open, with the majority of the land used for agricultural, woodland, or other rural purposes. However, the quality of living in the countryside around urban areas tends to be low, with severance between the area of open land and badly maintained woodlands and hedgerows.

In recent years there has been a growing interest in how the full environmental and social potential of the urban fringes can be unlocked and achieved. In England in 2005, the Countryside Agency (now part of Natural England) together with Groundwork, a community, and environmental regeneration body, produced a vision for the 'countryside in and around towns' that sets out ten 'functions' for a multi-functional urban fringe. The realization of this vision would provide a high-quality environment and living right on the urban doorstep and provide the adjacent town or city with a host of 'ecosystem services'. It is estimated that within England the urban fringe covers as much as 20% of the land area. Such an extensive resource must be managed and used more intelligently and sustainably if the country as a whole is to develop and function sustainably.

In the United States, urban areas are defined as contiguous territory having a density of at least 1,000 persons per square mile, though in some areas the density may be as low as 500 per square mile and remain urban. Urban areas also include the outlying territory of less density if it was connected to the core of the contiguous area by roads and is within 2.5 road miles of that core, or within 5 road miles of the core but separated by water or other undevelopable territories. Another territory with a population density of fewer than 1,000 people per square mile is included in the urban fringe if it eliminates an enclave or closes an indentation in the boundary of the urbanized area.

See also 

 Boomburb
 Commuter town
 Desakota
 Edge city
 Edge effects
 Exurb
 Habitat
 Habitat destruction
 Microdistrict
 Natural landscape
 Prime farmland
 Restoration ecology
 Suburb
 Wildland–urban interface

References

External links 

 Countryside Agency of England's online research library of urban rural fringe
 'Case Studies' of the Urban Rural fringe for students
 Kay's Geography: Kingston Park - retail change at the edge

Urbanization
Environmental terminology
Environmental design
Sustainable urban planning
Urban planning
Sustainable design